Sodalitas is a Latin word meaning "association, fraternity." It may refer to:

 a fraternal order of priests or similar association in ancient Rome; see Glossary of ancient Roman religion#sodalitas
 Sodality
 Sodality (Catholic Church)

See also
 Sodales Augustales, a priesthood in ancient Rome
 Confraternity